The 1990 Cork Intermediate Football Championship was the 55th staging of the Cork Intermediate Football Championship since its establishment by the Cork County Board in 1909. The draw for the opening round fixtures took place on 17 December 1989. The championship ran from 21 April to 14 October 1990.

The final was played on 14 October 1990 at Sam Maguire Park in Dunmanway, between Macroom and Castletownbere, in what was their first ever final meeting. Macroom won the match by 2–10 to 1–07 to claim their second championship title overall and a first title in eight years.

Results

First round

Second round

Quarter-finals

Semi-finals

Final

Championship statistics

Top scorers

Overall

In a single game

References

Cork Intermediate Football Championship